Datin Lisa Surihani Mohamed, born 23 March 1986) is a Malaysian actress, model, television host and commercial model. Starting her entertainment career in 1997, at the age of 11, Lisa has appeared in numerous feature films and television shows as well as TV commercials. Throughout her career, she won several awards, including Malaysian Film Festival for Best Actress. Her notable films include Goodbye Boys (2006) I'm Not Single (2008), Kapoww!! (2010), SAM: Saya Amat Mencintaimu (2012) and Ular (2013).

She married with singer-actor Yusry KRU in 2012 and blessed with two children. In February 2017, Lisa was appointed as the Goodwill Ambassador of UNICEF Malaysia.

Early life
Lisa was born in Kuala Lumpur to a family of Bugis with distant Chinese, Arab and Indian ancestry. Lisa studied in Sekolah Sri Inai during her primary and secondary years. She studied law at the Help University College and Aberystwyth University in Wales, United Kingdom.

Career
Lisa started out in an Ovaltine commercial at 11. Some of her earliest TV appearances were Gergasi on TV1 and later Ayah Kami. She first acted in films Goodbye Boys and recently Sekali Lagi with Malaysian actor Shaheizy Sam.

Lisa was awarded Best Actress in a Comedy at the Anugerah Lawak Warna. She also received the Best Actress award at the 23rd Malaysian Film Festival.

In 2012, she starred in few of the local films such as Lagenda Budak Setan 2, Cyber X: Ancaman Penggodam and Istanbul Aku Datang. She was given the Best Actress award at the 23rd Malaysian Film Festival. And also Most Popular Film Actress at Anugerah Bintang Popular Berita Harian.

Lisa's stage debut came in the November 2012 production of Teater Tun Siti Hasmah, a biographical sketch of first lady Tun Dr. Siti Hasmah Mohamad Ali. Apart from acting, Lisa has also appeared in TV Commercials namely Johnson & Johnson, McDonald’s, DiGi Easy Prepaid, Rexona, Maggi Cukup Rasa, MyEG, Lip Ice, Garnier, Honda Icon and Sofy.

Personal life
Lisa married Malaysian singer and actor Yusry Abdul Halim, of KRU fame, in 2012. The couple welcomed a daughter named Yahaira Leanne in September 2015. In November 2016, they announced that they are expecting their second child. On 23 April 2017, Lisa gave birth to her second child — a baby boy named Yusof Leonne. They had their third child, a son named Yunos Laith, on 23 June 2021.

On 11 January 2013, Lisa lost approximately RM50,000 in savings due to her ATM card being used by other individuals without her consent. Lisa and her mother Siti Amirah Ahmad lodged a police report. The incident occurred at 10:30 AM when Lisa's mother attempted to withdraw cash from an ATM in Section 9 and found that the money was missing. Lisa later expressed her gratitude towards the police who arrested a bank officer suspected of stealing and using the funds.

Filmography

Feature films

Television series

Television

Theater

Telemovie

Videography

Endorsements

Awards and nominations

References

External links

 

 

1986 births
People from Kuala Lumpur
Living people
Malaysian people of Malay descent
Malaysian people of Chinese descent
Malaysian people of Indian descent
Malaysian people of Arab descent
Malaysian Muslims
Malaysian film actresses
Malaysian television personalities
21st-century Malaysian actresses
Malaysian people of Bugis descent